Cai Lun (courtesy name: Jingzhong;  – 121 CE), formerly romanized as Ts'ai Lun, was a Chinese eunuch court official of the Eastern Han dynasty. He is traditionally regarded as the inventor of paper and the modern papermaking process. Although early forms of paper had existed since the 3rd century BCE, he occupies a pivotal place in the history of paper due to his addition of pulp via tree bark and hemp ends which resulted in the large-scale manufacture and worldwide spread of paper.

To assist Lady Dou in securing her adopted son as designated heir, he interrogated Consort Song and her sister, who then killed themselves.

Despite Emperor He's successful coup d'état against the Dou family in 92 CE, Cai was undisturbed by his former ally's downfall. His position in the Palace Workshop increased in scope; he became responsible for the production of ceremonial weapons, which the  reports were of exemplary craftsmanship. However, Cai's most noted innovation was in 105 CE, when he substantially improved the papermaking process with the use of tree bark, hemp waste, old rags, and fishnets. His new type of paper quickly displaced the bamboo and wooden slips used until then, and Cai received wealth and fame throughout the empire. In 110 CE, Lady Deng, who had become the empress dowager to the young Emperor An, appointed Cai to oversee 100 scholars' new edition of the Five Classics. When his ally Deng died in 121 CE, Cai was ordered to the Ministry of Justice because of his involvement in the death of the emperor's grandmother, Consort Song. Ashamed at his predicament and expecting to be sentenced to death, he committed suicide that year and died in the capital city in which he had spent almost his entire adult life.

Cai's improvements to paper-making are considered to have had an enormous impact on human history, and of those who created China's Four Great Inventions—the compass, gunpowder, papermaking and printing—Cai is the only inventor whose name is known. Although in China he is revered in ancestor worship, deified as the god of papermaking, and appears in Chinese folklore, he is mostly unknown outside of East Asia. His hometown in Leiyang remains an active center of paper production.

Biographical sources
Tsien Tsuen-hsuin, a modern sinologist, noted that while Fan's account is the most comprehensive, it is problematic as it was written nearly 300 years after Cai's death. Yan's brief 70-character account is near-contemporary but only survives in a reconstructed state from a lost original. Another older source is a brief mention by the 3rd-century scholar Tung Pa, who is quoted referencing Cai's papermaking accomplishments in the 10th-century leishu encyclopedia  (Readings of the Taiping Era).

Later history books, such as the Song dynasty's  (Compound Source of Matters and Facts), also include Cai and his work in papermaking. Sinologist T. H. Barrett suggested this was because "Cai Lun was, after all, a palace eunuch, precisely the sort of person normally viewed with antagonism by the regular bureaucrats who controlled the writing of official (and even most unofficial) history."

Life and career

Birth and background
Cai Lun was born in Guiyang Commandery (modern-day Leiyang, Hunan province) in the Eastern Han dynasty (25–220 CE). Other than being born into a poor family, virtually nothing is known of his early life. Guiyang was a southern commandery, where Han Chinese had immigrated for hundreds of years to plant and cultivate rice. Legends suggest there was a pool near his home, south of which was a stone mortar that Cai would later use for papermaking.

Early imperial court service

The  reports that he was first employed during the end of the  era (58–75) of Emperor Ming. The site of modern Guiyang Commandery was known to have had various iron mines at the time, so the former director of the Paper Museum in Tokyo, Kiyofusa Narita, suggested that "through the assistance of some who were in charge of the iron foundry, he found opportunity to go to the capital city". Narita cited Cai's future court appointment to oversee the production of weapons, especially swords, as evidence that he must have learned the skills to do so earlier in his life, likely from the iron foundry. Alternatively, if there is any truth to the various folktales about Cai, his supposed habits of trickery may have helped him receive a court appointment.

Cai is known to have been a eunuch in 75 CE, although it is possible he was employed somewhat earlier in the  era; sinologist Rafe de Crespigny suggested this was in the early 70s. In the Han dynasty, eunuchs were employed in imperial service and were the only people eligible for certain specialized tasks, such as watching over the imperial harem and the imperial household; there were also certain promotions available exclusively for them. Cai's position was probably as a liaison between the privy council and the emperor, and likely involved duties akin to a chamberlain for the imperial family. Narita notes Cai's role meant he would have had many chances to become acquainted with the most powerful people in the empire. Around 80 CE, during the subsequent  era (76–84) under Emperor Zhang, Cai was promoted to a Xiao Huangmen ("Attendant at the Yellow Gates"). The position, with a salary-rank of 600 shi or dan, involved delivering and receiving messages between the imperial palace apartments and the outside court.

Palace intrigue and workshop
Since 82 CE, Liu Qing, Zhang's son from his concubine Consort Song, had been the designated heir, secured by the favor of Empress Ma. However, Ma's death in 79 CE made Lady Dou the empress, and—aiming to develop her family's power—she adopted Prince Zhao with the intention of installing him as heir. As a result, when Song became ill in 82 and asked for herbs, Dou falsely accused her of planning to use the herbs for witchcraft against Zhang. Dou then ordered Cai to interrogate Consort Song and her sister, another imperial consort, to force a confession; they both killed themselves. Believing Dou's accusation, Zhang replaced Liu Qing with Prince Zhao as heir.

Cai served as a private counselor to He in political matters; this post gave Cai a salary-rank of 2000 shi, and was the highest eunuch-exclusive position, which also made him a chief eunuch of the palace. Cai was also designated  ("Prefect of the Palace Workshop" or "Prefect of the Masters of Techniques") later in 88 or 89 CE. While in this eunuch-only position, he would have been responsible for the production of instruments and weapons for imperial use. The role had a salary-rank of 600 shi—though this was in addition to the 2000 shi from his continued  post.

When Emperor He came of age in 92 CE he led various officials, especially Zheng Zhong, in a coup d'état to overthrow the Dou family. Cai was not involved in their removal, and though he was previously allied with the family, he was undisturbed by the Emperor's coup. In 97 CE, his position as  expanded in scope, as he became responsible for ceremonial swords and other items. The  describes his craftsmanship as high-quality and a model for later generations.

Development of paper

In 105, Cai publicly declared that he had invented a new composition for paper with a new papermaking process. Writing had a long history in China with writing surfaces being bamboo and wooden slips (wood for short text and bamboo for lengthy text). These media were inconvenient as they were awkward to store, heavy, and difficult to write on. After Meng Tian purportedly created an animal-hair brush for writing in 3rd-century BCE, silk and cloth became alternatives that addressed these issues, but they were too expensive for widespread use. The absence of a practical solution motivated continued experimentation with different materials; Cai's pulp solution proved the most effective. His process still used bamboo, but also introduced hemp waste, old rags, fishnets, and most importantly, bark from trees (likely mulberry). The materials were boiled to a pulp that was beaten with a wood or stone mallet before being mixed with a large amount of water. The resulting mixture was then processed with wooden sieves and the excess water removed, leaving the paper finished once dry. The paper that resulted from this method is often referred to as "Cai Hou paper". This event and its context are relayed in an often cited passage of the :

Many legends about the inspiration for Cai's invention exist; one of the most popular said that Cai was inspired by watching paper wasps make their nests. Tsien suggested that Cai was inspired by the people of his birthplace, who used bark from mulberry trees to create cloth as a writing surface. Irrespective of its origin, in 105 CE, Cai's new papermaking process both impressed He and earned him fame throughout the empire.

Final years and death
After the infant Emperor Shang's eight-month reign, in 106 CE Emperor He was succeeded by 13-year-old Emperor An, while Lady Deng ruled as empress dowager. Both Cai and Zheng maintained influence in Deng's court. In 110 CE, Deng assembled more than 100 scholars—including ,  and Ma Rong—in the Eastern Pavilion of the palace to begin creating a definitive edition of the Five Classics. She appointed Cai to oversee and supervise the production; de Crespigny said that this meant Cai "was seriously concerned with scholarship". Later that year Zheng died and Cai succeeded him as the head of the Dowager's household.

An assumed power after Deng's death in 121 CE, though the court was dominated by the influence of Empress Yan Ji and her brothers. Remembering Cai's part in the death of his grandmother, Consort Song, An ordered Cai to report to the Ministry of Justice to answer the charges, and presumably sentence him to death. Ashamed that the Emperor would send him to death in a dishonorable way, Cai bathed and dressed in formal clothes before killing himself by drinking poison.

Legacy

Global influence

Historical assessment
Due to modern archeological investigations, it is now certain that different forms of paper existed in China as early as 3rd-century BCE, though the findings do not necessarily discount the credit given to Cai. The Chinese scholar Tsien Tsuen-hsuin explained that the term used in Cai's ancient biography, zào yì, can be understood as "to initiate the idea", meaning that he furthered the ongoing process with the addition of important materials. Additionally, Cai is responsible for the earliest known use of tree bark and hemp as ingredients for paper, and it is clear that paper did not see widespread use in China until Cai's improvements. As such, scholars have revised his contributions as ones that furthered an ongoing process instead of a sudden discovery. However, due to the pivotal significance of his improvements and the resulting spread of paper use throughout China, Cai continues to be traditionally credited with inventing paper. There is also speculation that Cai was the patron of this achievement and took credit from someone else, as Feng Dao may have done with his improvements to printing.

Spread of paper

Cai's improvements to paper and the papermaking process are considered especially impactful to human history, as they resulted in the spread of literature and knowledge around the world, and advancements in communications. However, Cai is only somewhat known outside East Asia and is often excluded from major encyclopedias. The scholar of paper history, Thomas Francis Carter, drew parallels between Cai and Johannes Gutenberg, the inventor of a movable type printing press, calling them "spiritual father and son" respectively. In his 1978 book, The 100: A Ranking of the Most Influential Persons in History, Michael H. Hart ranked him 7th, above figures such as Gutenberg, Christopher Columbus, Albert Einstein and Charles Darwin. In 2007, Time ranked him among the "Best Inventors" of all time.

After Cai's efforts in 105 CE, a renowned paper maker who may have been an apprentice to Cai—variously recorded by modern sources as Zuo Bo; Tso Po (courtesy name: Tzu-i) from Tung-Hai, Shandong; or Tso Tzǔ-yi—improved the process in 150 CE or later in the Han dynasty. Other than this, the basic principles of Cai's papermaking process have changed little over time, and the new form of paper spread throughout China. According to legend, the Buddhist monk Damjing brought the process to Japan, though this is unconfirmed. Damjing occupies a similar patron saint position in Japan that Cai does in China. By the 600s the process appeared in Turkestan, Korea, and India, while Chinese prisoners from the Battle of Talas spread the knowledge to Arabs in the Abbasid Caliphate. Unlike many Chinese inventions that were created independently in Western Europe, the modern papermaking process was a wholly Chinese product and gradually spread via the Arabs to Europe, where it also saw widespread manufacturing by the 12th century. In August 2010, the International Astronomical Union honored Cai's legacy by naming a crater on the Moon after him.

Influence in China

Folklore

While Cai's personal life is mostly unknown, a popular folktale suggests he was a shopkeeper and trickster with a wife and brother, though there is no historical confirmation for this. The story goes that after Cai's improvements to paper there was little demand for the product so he had an ever-growing surplus. As such, Cai and his wife developed a ploy to increase sales; they told townsfolk that paper becomes money in the afterlife when burned.

In the most popular variation to the tale, Cai Mo and Hui Niang—Cai's brother and sister-in-law of unconfirmed historicity—take the place of Cai and his wife. In this version, Hui convinced Cai Mo to learn the new papermaking trade from his younger brother, and when he returned in only three months, the paper he and his wife produced was too low quality to sell. To address this, Hui pretended to have died, and Cai Mo stood beside her coffin, wailing and burning money as tribute. Then, their neighbors checked in on them, and Hui sprung out of the coffin, explaining that the burned money was transferred to her in the afterlife, with which she paid ghosts to return her from the dead. Believing the story, the neighbors quickly purchased large amounts of paper for their own use. While mostly a fictitious story, intense wailing and burning offerings are commonplace in Chinese culture.

Deification and remembrance
Of those who originated China's Four Great Inventions of the ancient world—the compass, gunpowder, papermaking and printing—only the inventor of papermaking, Cai Lun, is known. Additionally, in comparison to other Chinese inventions such as the writing brush and ink, the development of paper is the best documented in literary sources.

After his death in 121 CE, a shrine with his grave was built in his hometown, but was soon neglected and damaged by floods while his name was largely forgotten. During the early Tang dynasty, many national heroes were deified, such as Li Bai and Guan Yu as the gods of wine and war respectively. Cai was among the important people declared gods, and was deified as the national god of papermaking. Cai also became a patron saint for papermakers, with his image often being painted or printed onto paper mills and paper shops in not only China, but also Japan. In 1267, a man named Chen Tsunghsi raised funds to repair the long-damaged shrine, and renovated it to include a statue of Cai and a mausoleum. Chen stated that "Tsai Lung's [Cai Lun's] extraordinary talent and his achievement are exemplary to all ages." A stone mortar, which legends claim Cai used to make paper, may have been brought to the mausoleum, although other sources say it was brought to the Imperial Museum in the capital of Lin'an. A great ceremony was held for the new mausoleum, though it fell into ruin again and was restored in 1955. Today, the temple still stands in Leiyang as the  near a pool, renamed the "Cai Lun Pool", that was thought to be near Cai's home. In the Song dynasty, Fei Chu said there was a temple in Chengdu where hundreds of families in the papermaking business would come to worship Cai.

During the late Qing dynasty, papermakers created religious groups, known as either "spirit-money associations" or "Cai Lun associations". The  from Macun and Zhongxing denied the demand, citing their long history of worshipping Cai, which resulted in increasing conflict between the sides and eventually a lawsuit. The county magistrate reproached both parties for descending into conflict and said: "Did they not understand that all of them owed their livelihood to Lord Cai, who had taught them the art of papermaking? Were they not all disciples of Lord Cai, who wanted them to share the benefits of the trade?"

In the 21st century, Leiyang is still famous as Cai's birthplace and has active paper production. In modern-day China, Cai's name is closely associated with paper, and is the namesake of the Cai Lun Paper Culture Museum and at least five roads: , Pudong, Shanghai; Cailun Road, Minhang District, Shanghai; Cailun Road, Fuyang District, Hangzhou, Zhejiang; Cailun Road East Crossing, Weiyang District, Xi'an; and Cailun Road, Yaohai District, Hefei, Anhui.

Notes

Citations

Early
When applicable, this list identifies the relevant passage of early sources in addition to a modern citation. Per WP:TRANSCRIPTION, a translation from a Wikipedia editor is given and, if available, a loose translation from a modern source is provided.

Modern

Bibliography

Early

Modern

Books

Journals

Online

Further reading

 
 
 
 
  See pages 79–80 for information on a stamp of Cai Lun issued by China Post in 1962

External links
 
 Cai Lun at Chinaknowledge

Year of birth uncertain
121 deaths
1st-century Chinese people
2nd-century Chinese people
Chinese inventors
Chinese politicians who committed suicide
Deified Chinese people
Han dynasty eunuchs
Han dynasty politicians
Papermakers
Papermaking in China
People from Leiyang
Suicides by poison
Suicides in the Han dynasty